was laid down on 15 November 1944 at Orange, Texas, by the Levingston Shipbuilding Co.; launched on 14 December 1944; and commissioned on 26 February 1945. She was the second Navy ship named for Tatnuck, an Indian village in the vicinity of Worcester, Massachusetts.

Following shakedown training in March, Tatnuck was briefly assigned to the Atlantic Fleet before being transferred to the Pacific Fleet with her home yard at Pearl Harbor. During the fall of 1945, the ocean tug saw service with the occupation forces in the Far East. On 26 January 1946, she steamed out of the lagoon at Eniwetok Atoll, reached Pearl Harbor on 19 February, and remained there until 30 April when she headed for Puget Sound. Tatnuck arrived in Bremerton, Washington, on 3 January 1947.

For the remainder of her Navy career, Tatnuck operated in the 13th Naval District. Generally, her range of operations extended from the ports of southern California north along the coast of North America and west to the Aleutian Islands. However, during each of four of her last five years of service — 1966, 1968, 1969, and 1970 — she made a voyage to Balboa, the Pacific terminus of the Panama Canal. In the main, her duties consisted of ocean towing, target towing, and salvage work; but occasionally she was also called upon to assist scientists of the University of Washington's Applied Physics Laboratory in their research work for the Navy.

After more than 26 years of service, she was placed out of commission at Bremerton, Wash., on 1 July 1971 and berthed there with the Pacific Reserve Fleet. She was disposed of by sale in June 1979.

As of 2018, she is operating commercially under the name Tamaraw.

References
 
 NavSource Online: Service Ship Photo Archive USS Tatnuck (ATA-195)

 

1944 ships
Ships built in Orange, Texas
Sotoyomo-class tugs